Ripponden is a civil parish in the metropolitan borough of Calderdale, West Yorkshire, England.   It contains 181 listed buildings that are recorded in the National Heritage List for England.  Of these, two are listed at Grade I, the highest of the three grades, eight are at Grade II*, the middle grade, and the others are at Grade II, the lowest grade.  The parish contains the village of Ripponden, smaller settlements, including Barkisland and Rishworth, and the surrounding area.  Most of the listed buildings are houses and associated structures, cottages, farmhouses, laithe houses, and farm buildings, and almost all of these are built in stone with stone slate roofs and contain mullioned windows.  The other listed buildings include churches and chapels, public houses, bridges, milestones, a cross base converted into a mounting block, schools, a set of stocks, a pinfold, former mills and associated structures, a former shooting lodge, two wheelhouses for a reservoir, and two war memorials.


Key

Buildings

References

Citations

Sources

Lists of listed buildings in West Yorkshire